The James Ross Island group is a group of islands located close to the northeastern tip of the Antarctic Peninsula. The largest islands in the group are James Ross Island, Snow Hill Island, Vega Island, and Seymour Island. The islands lie to the south of the Joinville Island group. The groups contains several scientific bases, notably Marambio Base, and numerous important palaeontological sites.

See also
 List of Antarctic and sub-Antarctic islands

 
Islands of Graham Land